The 1978–79 Western Kentucky Hilltoppers men's basketball team represented Western Kentucky University during the 1978–79 NCAA Division I men's basketball season. The Hilltoppers were members of the Ohio Valley Conference and led by future National Collegiate Basketball Hall of Fame coach Gene Keady in his first year as head coach.  WKU finished tied for second in the OVC regular season.  The conference tournament was hosted by regular season champion Eastern Kentucky.  Western Kentucky had defeated EKU twice during the season, but their third meeting in the conference tournament championship ended in controversy.  The Hilltoppers held a one-point lead when the game clock expired, however, due to crowd noise, the referees and time keeper did not hear the buzzer.  A foul was called on WKU with no time left and Eastern Kentucky made two free throws to win the game.  A review of game film afterwards showed that the foul was called 3.5 seconds after the game clock had ended.  Western Kentucky appealed to the OVC Commissioner, however, their appeal was denied. This perceived wrong was a factor in Western Kentucky's decision to leave the OVC in 1982.  Greg Jackson and Trey Trumbo were named to the All-OVC Team, and Jackson was OVC Tournament MVP.

Schedule

|-
!colspan=6| Regular season

|-

 

|-
!colspan=6| 1979 Ohio Valley Conference Men's Basketball Tournament

|-

References

Western Kentucky Hilltoppers basketball seasons
Western Kentucky
Western Kentucky Basketball, Men's
Western Kentucky Basketball, Men's